Lorenzo Montúfar y Rivera  (March 11, 1823 – March 21, 1898) was a Guatemalan politician and lawyer. Superb leader and speaker, helped the liberal regime of Justo Rufino Barrios, served in the Guatemalan legislature, taught in the College of Law of the Universidad Nacional de Guatemala and, towards the end of his life, was a presidential candidate himself losing to general José María Reyna Barrios. He was also Foreign Secretary of Costa Rica in 1856 and from 1870 to 1873, and President of University of Saint Thomas, also in Costa Rica.

Biography 

Montúfar y Rivera was the son of Rafael Montúfar y Coronado and Maria del Rosario Rivera. He was married in San José, Costa Rica on January 26, 1851, to Maria de Jesus Madriz Enriquez, the daughter of Juan de los Santos Madriz y Cervantes and Paulina Enríquez Díaz Cabeza de Baca.  He graduated as a lawyer from the Pontifica Universidad de San Carlos Borromeo in Guatemala.

Member of the Liberal Party, Montúfar had a deep aversion towards then Guatemalan President Rafael Carrera and then Aycinena family that worked closely to him, and was one of their harshest critics; in spite of it, Carrera esteemed Montúfar deeply and, even though he always had Montufar at hand, never did him any harm. After Carrera rule got reinforced in 1854, Montúfar left Guatemala for Costa Rica, he was Magistrate, Secretary of Foreign Affairs from 1856 to 1857 and from 1870 to 1873, and vice-chancellor of the University of Saint Thomas, where he taught international law and other subjects. He also held the position of Minister of Costa Rica in Great Britain.

In politics he was characterized by his liberal ideology and his extreme anti-clericalism, especially against the Jesuits. After the triumph of the Liberal Reform of 1871, he returned to Guatemala when Justo Rufino Barrios started his term in office in 1873.  Eloquent orator and debater, was then Ambassador of Guatemala in Madrid  and participated in the legislature that wrote the Constitution of 1879, in which he had outstanding participation. 

Because of his solid integrity, when he was the Guatemalan Foreign Secretary, he defended Guatemalan territoriality against the aggressiveness of general Justo Rufino Barrios, his ministers and diplomats: first, strongly protested the fact Guatemala had lost Chiapas to Mexico; and later, the loss of Soconusco, which saw thousands of miles stripped from Guatemala territory with the consent of both president and cabinet members. This position earned him the exile; Barrios -on the advice of Father Angel Maria Arroyo, Montúfar old personal friend and now one of Barrios' favorites- expelled him from Guatemala, and then, after the death of Barrios in 1885, he was forbidden from return by the government of general Manuel Barillas -where Father Arroyo was serving as Foreign Secretary and Secretary of Education-. Therefore, he then was rejected by both liberal and conservative Guatemalans.

1892 Presidential elections 

Towards the end of his life, but with all of his will and power still intact, he ran for office in the 1892 presidential elections. It was the first election in Guatemala that allowed the candidates to make propaganda in the local newspapers.  The candidates who ran for office were

Barillas Bercian was unique among all liberal presidents of Guatemala between 1871 and 1944: he handed over power to his successor peacefully. When election time approached, he sent for the three Liberal candidates to ask them what their government plan would be. The following anecdote recounts better what happened then:

First arrived lawyer Francisco Lainfiesta, and General Barillas, with the friendliest of smiles, said: «Mr. Lainfiesta: you are one of the candidates in the upcoming elections and perhaps the more likely to win. Therefore, I would like to know what your attitude and your political system of government will be, if you get to win. Especially, I would like to know your attitude about my person; because I have made my mistakes, I do not deny it. I was a simple worker at my carpentry when General Justo Rufino Barrios sent for me to be appointed second presidential designate. I would therefore, Mr. Lainfiesta, know what conduct you will observe towards me." Mr. Lainfiesta said: «General Barillas: if luck would favor me with the election victory, my government will be based on strict adherence to the Constitution; the law would be the law and anyone who has acquired some responsibility, will have to answer for it before the relevant courts. A firm and righteous compliance with the constitutional provisions shall be the standard of my conduct as president». «Very well» said general Barillas, and both parted cordially.

Barillas then brought in Dr. Montúfar and interrogated him in the same or similar way as he had done Mr. Lainfiesta. Dr. Montúfar responded in similar terms as Lainfiesta, stressing his claims to obedience of the Constitution and strict enforcement.

Finally general Reyna Barrios came in; when in the midst of pleasant conversation, General Barillas repeated his question, and Reyna replied, with a sincere smile: «We should not even talk about that, general; because you and I are the same. Rest assured that I will know how to respect and protect you.» And then both shook hands with effusion. By the election period, the first two days of voting favored Lainfiesta. But by the third day, a huge column of Quetzaltenango and Totonicapán Indigenous people came down from the mountains to vote for general Reyna Barrios. The official agents did their job: Reyna was elected president and, not to offend the losing candidates, Barillas gave them checks to cover the costs of their presidential campaigns. Reyna Barrios, of course, received nothing, but he went on to become President on March 15, 1892.

Death 

Montufar died in Guatemala City during the early morning of May 22, 1898. Despite being his passing expected by his fellow Guatemalans -since he had been visibly ill for a while-, there was deep sadness in the capital city. There were large demonstrations at his funeral, and government officials praised him in the local newspapers.  A hundred years after his birth, the government of José María Orellana erected a monument to his memory at the Avenida Reforma; the sculptor was the renowned Guatemalan artist Rafael Rodríguez Padilla, and this was the first bronze sculpture produced in Guatemala.

Works 

Owner of vast culture, Montufar was corresponding member of the Royal Spanish Academy of Language.
 "History of Central America 'in 1920, following the overthrow of licensed Manuel Estrada Cabrera, the Unionist party -made by several Guatemalan conservative leaders ordered the cremated and destroy all copies of this work, since extolled the virtues and supuestas—true liberals Central- American leaders. Even the copy that existed in the National Archives of Guatemala was extracted and used to wrap grocery stores 
 "Autobiographical Memories'. 1893

quotes

Gallery

See also 
 Justo Rufino Barrios
 Rafael Carrera

References

Bibliography

Notes 

1823 births
1898 deaths
People from Guatemala City
Guatemalan people of Spanish descent
Liberal Party (Guatemala) politicians
Universidad de San Carlos de Guatemala alumni
19th-century Guatemalan people
Foreign ministers of Costa Rica
Foreign ministers of Guatemala